Erebus albicinctus,  the Oriental purple owl-moth is a moth of the family Erebidae. It is found in Taiwan, China (Shaanxi), India (Assam, Meghalaya), Nepal, Bangladesh, Thailand and Indonesia (Sumatra).

References

Moths described in 1844
Erebus (moth)